Ciphers and Constellations in Love with a Woman is a painting by Joan Miró created in 1941. It is in the Art Institute of Chicago, Chicago, Illinois, USA. It is one of the 23 pieces in Miró's Constellations series.

The painting inspired a poem of the same title by Ruth Moon Kempher.

References
 

1941 paintings
Paintings by Joan Miró
Paintings in the collection of the Art Institute of Chicago